This article is the discography of Irish pop band the Nolans, known as the Nolan Sisters between 1974 and 1979.

Albums

Studio albums

Compilation albums

Video albums

EPs and mini-albums

Singles

References 

Discographies of Irish artists
Pop music group discographies